Stefan Yurukov (born 16 June 1972 in Sofia) is a Bulgarian former football player. After his retirement Yurukov switched to police work.

Honours
Litex Lovech
 Bulgarian League: 1998–99
 Bulgarian Cup (2): 2000–01, 2003–04

Dalian Shide
 Chinese FA Super Cup: 2002

References

1972 births
Living people
Bulgarian footballers
PFC Cherno More Varna players
PFC Litex Lovech players
Gaziantepspor footballers
PFC Spartak Varna players
Liaoning F.C. players
First Professional Football League (Bulgaria) players
Expatriate footballers in Turkey
Expatriate footballers in China

Association football forwards